The 2021–22 Lamar Cardinals basketball team represented Lamar University during the 2021–22 NCAA Division I men's basketball season. The Cardinals were led by first-year head coach Alvin Brooks and played their home games at the Montagne Center in Beaumont, Texas as members of the first-year members of the Western Athletic Conference.

The school announced on January 14, 2021, that the Cardinals would leave the Southland Conference to join the WAC for the 2021–22 season.

Previous season
In a season limited due to the ongoing COVID-19 pandemic, the Cardinals finished the 2020–21 season 10–18, 6–10 in Southland play to finish seventh place. In the Southland tournament, the Cardinals defeated Houston Baptist and Sam Houston State before losing to Abilene Christian in the semifinals.

Following the season, the school announced that head coach Tic Price would not be retained. Shortly thereafter, Alvin Brooks, previously an assistant coach at Houston, was named the new head coach

Offseason

Coaching changes
New assistants, Charles Harral, Mikhail McClean, Wendell Moore, and Aaron Proctor, were added to the staff.

Departures

Source:

Incoming transfers

Source:

Roster 
Sources:

TV and radio media

All Lamar games will be broadcast on KLVI, also known as News Talk 560.

Live video of all home games will be broadcast on ESPN platforms.

Schedule and results

|-
!colspan=12 style=| Exhibition

|-
!colspan=12 style=| Non-conference regular season

|-
!colspan=12 style=| WAC regular season

Source

See also 
2021–22 Lamar Lady Cardinals basketball team

References

Lamar Cardinals basketball seasons
Lamar
Lamar Cardinals basketball
Lamar Cardinals basketball